Lenca may refer to:
Lenca people, an indigenous people and their historical culture of western Honduras and El Salvador
Lenca language, indigenous language(s) of the Lenca
C.D. Lenca, a Honduran soccer player
Cephalotes lenca, a species of arboreal ant of the genus Cephalotes

See also 
 Lenka (disambiguation)